Robert B. Anderson was a teacher, warden, state legislator, and postmaster in Georgetown County, South Carolina. He served several terms in the South Carolina House of Representatives as part of a fusion ticket and was succeeded by John Bolts.

See also
African-American officeholders during and following the Reconstruction era

References

Members of the South Carolina House of Representatives
Year of birth missing
Year of death missing
South Carolina postmasters